The Northwest Sequoia League is a high school athletic league that is part of the CIF Central Section.

Members
 Chowchilla High School
 Sierra High School
 Kerman High School
 Washington Union High School
 Liberty (Madera Ranchos) High School
 Yosemite High School

References

CIF Central Section